St Mary al-Tahira Church (church of the Immaculate Conception) is a church in the Iraqi city of Baghdida.  Its construction started in 1932 and carried on until its consecration in 1948. It is the largest church building of the Syriac Catholic Church, and the largest church of Iraq. Having suffered severe destruction during the attacks by ISIS from 2014 to 2016, it has been under reconstruction since the beginning of 2020. The reconstruction is largely financed by Aid to the Church in Need.

The Church, which is not to be confused with the Church of the same name in Mosul, is one of the major sites in the Pope Frances' visit to Iraq from 5-8 March 2021.

References 

Churches in Iraq
Catholic church buildings in Asia